There are at least 6 major conflicts known as The Battle of Carthage. They are,
 Battle of Carthage (c. 149 BCE), in the Third Punic War
 Battle of Carthage (238), in the revolt of Gordian II against the Roman emperor Maximinus Thrax
 Battle of Carthage (439), Carthage was captured by the Vandals from the Western Roman Empire on 19 October 439
Battle of Carthage (533), also known as the Battle of Ad Decimum, between the Vandals and the Byzantine Empire 
 Battle of Carthage (698), part of the Islamic conquests, between the Byzantine Exarchate of Africa, and the Umayyad Caliphate.
 Battle of Cartagena de Indias, a battle of the War of Jenkins' Ear between Spain and Great Britain
 Engagement near Carthage, a battle of the American Civil War